The Face at the Window is a 1939 British horror film directed by George King. It was the second sound film adaptation of the 1897 stage melodrama by F. Brooke Warren after the 1932 version.

Plot 
In Paris in 1880, a series of murders involving a grotesque face appearing at victims' windows, is attributed to a mysterious Wolf Man. After being accused of being the perpetrator, bank clerk Lucien Cortier (John Warwick) seeks to uncover the true identity of the murderer. Chevalier Lucio del Gardo seems determined to successfully prosecute Cortier for the murders.

Cast 
Tod Slaughter – Chevalier Lucio del Gardo
Marjorie Taylor – Cecile de Brisson
John Warwick – Lucien Cortier
Leonard Henry – Gaston, the Cook
Aubrey Mallalieu – M. de Brisson
Robert Adair – Police Inspector Gouffert
Wallace Evennett – Professor LeBlanc
Kay Lewis – Babette, the Maid
Bill Shine – Pierre, Babette's Beau
Margaret Yarde – La Pinan
Harry Terry – The Face at the Window

Critical reception 
In a contemporary review, Film Weekly called the film "a vintage thriller, put over in the right, rich spirit of years ago"; while more recently Britmovie praised "a sinister Tod Slaughter hamming it up marvellously." and the Radio Times wrote, "As with any film featuring the outrageously operatic antics of early horror star Tod Slaughter, this slow, stagebound murder-mystery would be completely unwatchable without the producer-star's presence."

References

External links 

Face at the Window at BFI Screenonline

1939 horror films
1930s historical horror films
British historical horror films
British black-and-white films
Films directed by George King
Films scored by Jack Beaver
Films set in 1880
Films set in Paris
British werewolf films
Films shot at Beaconsfield Studios
British Lion Films films
1930s English-language films
1930s British films